= Double Shock =

Shock and Double Shock were 1958-1959 American TV horror movie show with Bob Hersh as "The Advisor". Hersh used to emerge from a sarcophagus to introduce the horror B-movies.
